"Savage Love (Laxed – Siren Beat)", originally known as "Savage Love", is a song by New Zealand music producer Jawsh 685 and American singer Jason Derulo.  The song was officially released on 11 June 2020, following the resolution of sample clearance issues between the two artists.

"Savage Love (Laxed – Siren Beat)" peaked at number one in seventeen countries, including the United Kingdom, New Zealand and Australia. A remix featuring South Korean septet BTS was released on 2 October 2020, featuring a new verse sung in Korean. It features vocals predominantly from members Jungkook, Suga, and J-Hope. The remix reached number one on the US Billboard Hot 100, earning the second number-one song for both Jason Derulo and BTS, and first for Jawsh 685 on the chart. Additionally, the remix reached number one on the Billboard Global 200. BTS was listed as a credited act for one week on the mentioned charts.

Background and promotion

Laxed (Siren Beat) 
Jawsh 685 had originally posted the instrumental, titled "Laxed (Siren Beat)", to YouTube in 2019. Following its viral success, "Laxed (Siren Beat)" was officially released to online platforms on 24 April 2020 and Jawsh 685 signed with Columbia Records in May 2020.

Unauthorised usage by Derulo 
On 11 May 2020, Derulo teased "Savage Love" which was built off of a sample of "Laxed (Siren Beat)".  However, Derulo did not credit Jawsh 685 nor did he obtain clearance for the sample.  This sparked widespread backlash and calls for Derulo to properly clear the sample and credit Jawsh 685.  It was reported that Jawsh 685 was in talks with multiple artists, including Derulo, to remix "Laxed (Siren Beat)", but Derulo "went 'rogue'" and released "Savage Love" without properly obtaining permission to do so.  A source close to the situation stated that Derulo wanted the song for himself and to only have Jawsh 685 as the producer, but Jawsh 685 wanted more control over the work and did not want to be "bullied by a larger artist into putting [the song] out".

Official release 
On 11 June 2020, Columbia Records announced that the two artists had "put aside their differences" with Jawsh 685 allowing Derulo to use the sample. Jawsh 685 is credited as an artist and co-writer, as well as the track's sole producer. Additionally, "(Laxed – Siren Beat)" was added to the title.

Speaking to the Official Charts Company, Jawsh 685 stated that the track's early success took him entirely by surprise.  "I created it one day after school last year," he said. "[I was] feeling relaxed so it made sense to call it 'Laxed'. The thought going into it took longer than the actual making of it – I think it only took me 4 hours to make."

He says he felt "happy and excited" when it took off as a dance challenge on TikTok. "There were so many people doing it," he recalls. "I couldn’t pick a favourite but it was pretty cool to see the mix of cultures doing it – Indian, Chinese and Pacific Island."

"Jason first hit me up on my IG and he told me about his plan on adding lyrics to my beat," Jawsh 685 explained. "We never really came to an official agreement as I had a great team helping me make the best decisions. His song was pretty catchy, so in the end we came to an official agreement."

Lyrics and composition 

Jawsh 685 created the instrumental as a tribute to his Samoan and Cook Island heritage (685 is the country calling code for Samoa). It is an example of a siren jam, a New Zealand/Pasifika trend of creating beats to play through siren speakers, usually attached to cars or bikes. It also became a viral trend on TikTok, with users inspired to post "Culture Dance" videos in which they celebrate their heritage by dancing to the song while wearing traditional costumes.

To distinguish the song from other earlier unauthorised releases, a vocalisation of Jason Derulo's name is heard before the song begins.

Commercial performance

North America 
"Savage Love (Laxed – Siren Beat)" debuted at number 81 on the Billboard Hot 100 on the issue dated 27 June 2020. The song reached the top 10 in its seventh week on the chart on 8 August. With the ascension of the song to the top ten, "Savage Love (Laxed – Siren Beat)" became Jawsh 685's first top 10 hit as well as Derulo's first top ten hit since "Want to Want Me" in 2015 and first top 40 hit since "Swalla" in 2017. A remixed version with the South Korean band BTS jumped from number eight to number one on the issue dated 17 October 2020, becoming the second number-one hits for both Jason Derulo (his first since "Whatcha Say" in 2009, the longest time in between number-one hits for male artists since Dr. Dre's reached number one in 2009 with "Crack a Bottle" after a 12-year hiatus) and BTS (after their previous single "Dynamite") as well as Jawsh 685's first chart-topper.

"Savage Love (Laxed – Siren Beat)" debuted at number 26 on the Canadian Hot 100. It later reached number one on the issue dated 15 August 2020, becoming Jawsh 685's first and Jason Derulo's first number-one single in the country.

Europe, Oceania and Latin America 
In the United Kingdom, "Savage Love (Laxed – Siren Beat)" debuted at number 22 on the UK Singles Chart on 19 June 2020 – for the week ending date 25 June 2020. It eventually peaked at the top of the chart on 3 July  2020 – for the week ending date 9 July 2020 – becoming Derulo's fifth number-one song in Britain. Overall, the single spent three consecutive weeks at the top of the UK Singles Chart.

In Ireland, the song debuted at number 23 in the charts before climbing to number one five weeks later, becoming Derulo's first number-one single in the Republic of Ireland.

The song also reached number one in Austria, Belgium, Germany, the Netherlands, Norway, Romania, Scotland, Sweden and Switzerland, as well as the top-ten in Czech Republic, Denmark, Finland, Italy and Slovakia.

In Australia, it topped the ARIA Charts for six non-consecutive weeks. The song also reached number one in New Zealand.

In Latin America, "Savage Love (Laxed – Siren Beat)" reached the top-ten in Panama and El Salvador, peaking at numbers 8 and 10, respectively. It also reached the top-twenty in Argentina, peaking at number 13.

Track listings 
Original version
"Laxed (Siren Beat)" – 3:21

Jason Derulo version
"Savage Love (Laxed – Siren Beat)" – 2:51

BTS remix
"Savage Love (Laxed – Siren Beat)" (BTS remix) – 3:04
"Savage Love (Laxed – Siren Beat)" (BTS remix) (instrumental) – 3:04

Personnel 
Credits adapted from Tidal.
 Jawsh 685 – production, songwriting, drum machine, keyboard, recording engineering
 Jason Derulo – songwriting, co-production, drum machine, lyrics
 Phil Greiss – songwriting, miscellaneous production, guitar
 Jacob Kasher – songwriting, lyrics
 Chris Quock – assistant engineering
 Robert Soukiasyan – mixing engineering
 Matthew Spatola - guitar, bass

Charts

Weekly charts

Year-end charts

Awards and nominations

Certifications

Release history

BTS remix

Background and composition 
A remix of "Savage Love (Laxed – Siren Beat)" with South Korean boy band BTS was released for digital download and streaming in various countries on 2 October 2020 through Columbia Records. An accompanying animated lyric video was uploaded to BTS' YouTube channel on the same day. Speaking about how the collaboration with BTS happened, Jawsh 685 said:

The remix has identical credits to the original "Savage Love (Laxed – Siren Beat)" with the addition of BTS band members Suga and J-Hope as songwriters. On the song, BTS members, predominantly Jungkook, J-Hope and Suga, perform in both English and Korean, alongside Jason Derulo. Jungkook sings mostly on the chorus while Suga and J-Hope perform rap-inspired vocals on a new verse in Korean. Prior to its digital release, BTS performed a TikTok dance challenge to the original version of the song alongside Jason Derulo and Jawsh 685.

Commercial performance 
Following the release of the remix, the song rose to number one on the US Billboard Hot 100 crediting the remix on the issue dated 17 October 2020, becoming the second number-one hits for both Jason Derulo (his first since "Whatcha Say" in 2009, the longest time in between number-one hits for male artists since Dr. Dre's "Crack a Bottle" reached number one after a 12-year hiatus in 2009) and BTS (after their previous single "Dynamite") as well as Jawsh 685's first chart topper. BTS became the first group to simultaneously hold the top two spots on the Hot 100 in a decade since Black Eyed Peas in 2009 and fifth overall group to do so. The remix earned 16 million US streams, 70.6 million radio airplay audio impressions and sold 76,000 copies, becoming the second top-selling song of the week. It peaked at number one on the Billboard Global 200 chart, with 77.5 million global streams and 62,000 global downloads, making BTS the first act to earn multiple number-one songs on the chart, and at number three on the Global Excl. U.S. Chart. It also peaked at number one on Canadian Hot 100, becoming BTS' first chart-topping single in the country and reached number six on South Korea's Gaon Digital Chart and number nine on the New Zealand Hot Singles chart.

The following week, on the issue dated 24 October 2020, "Savage Love" dropped from number one to number six on the Billboard Hot 100, with BTS' credit removed as the remix did not outperform the original version during the tracking week.

Credits and personnel 
Credits adapted from Tidal.

 BTS – vocals
 Jason Derulo – vocals, co-producer, composer, songwriter, drum machine
 J-Hope – songwriter
 Suga – songwriter
 Jawsh 685 – producer, composer, recording engineer, drum machine, keyboards
 Jacob Kasher Hindlin – composer, songwriter
 Phil Greiss – composer, guitar, miscellaneous producer
 Pdogg – engineer
 Chris Quock – assistant engineer
 Juan "Saucy" Peña – vocal engineer
 Jenna Andrews – vocal producer
 Robbie Soukiasyan – mixing engineer

Charts

Accolades

Certifications

Release history

See also 

List of Airplay 100 number ones of the 2020s
 List of Billboard Global 200 number ones of 2020
List of Billboard Hot 100 number ones of 2020
List of Billboard Hot 100 top-ten singles in 2020
List of Billboard Mainstream Top 40 number-one songs of 2020
List of Canadian Hot 100 number-one singles of 2020
List of Dutch Top 40 number-one singles of 2020
List of German airplay number-one songs of 2020
List of Media Forest most-broadcast songs of the 2020s in Romania
List of most-streamed songs on Spotify
List of number-one digital songs of 2020 (Canada)
List of number-one hits of 2020 (Austria)
List of number-one hits of 2020 (Germany)
List of number-one hits of 2020 (Switzerland)
List of number-one singles of 2020 (Australia)
List of number-one singles of 2020 (Ireland)
List of number-one singles of 2020 (Slovenia)
List of number-one songs of 2020 (Mexico)
List of top 10 singles in 2020 (France)
List of top 10 singles in 2020 (Ireland)
List of UK Singles Chart number ones of the 2020s
List of Ultratop 50 number-one singles of 2020

References 

2019 songs
2020 singles
2020 songs
Billboard Hot 100 number-one singles
BTS songs
Canadian Hot 100 number-one singles
Columbia Records singles
Dutch Top 40 number-one singles
Irish Singles Chart number-one singles
Jason Derulo songs
Macaronic songs
Number-one singles in Australia
Number-one singles in Austria
Number-one singles in Germany
Number-one singles in Israel
Number-one singles in New Zealand
Number-one singles in Norway
Number-one singles in Romania
Number-one singles in Sweden
Number-one singles in Switzerland
Songs about heartache
Songs written by Jacob Kasher
Songs written by Jason Derulo
Songs written by J-Hope
Songs written by Suga (rapper)
TikTok
UK Singles Chart number-one singles
Ultratop 50 Singles (Flanders) number-one singles